Cops, Crooks and Civilians is a set of cardboard miniatures published by Steve Jackson Games.

Contents
Cops, Crooks and Civilians are a set of 37 cardboard miniatures in 25mm scale designed by Denis Loubet, depicting non-player characters for superspy, superhero, or other role-playing games set in modern times.

Reception
W.G. Armintrout reviewed Cops, Crooks and Civilians in Space Gamer No. 64. Armintrout commented that "Where else can you find figures like these? And at this price and quality? Try them."

References

See also
List of lines of miniatures

Miniature figures